The Mario franchise, which originated as a series of platform games, has inspired a variety of role-playing video games released on multiple Nintendo video game consoles. All games feature Mario as the protagonist, who is often accompanied by one or more playable characters, with the goal of defeating the main antagonist, primarily Bowser. The first role-playing game in the franchise, Super Mario RPG (1996), was developed by Square for the Super NES. The two primary sub-series, Paper Mario and Mario & Luigi, follow conventions established in the original game.

The Paper Mario series is developed by Intelligent Systems and published by Nintendo, the first game being Paper Mario which was released for the Nintendo 64 in 2000. The original Paper Mario games are role-playing games, though installments in the series since Sticker Star also incorporate action-adventure elements. The series has received positive reviews, being praised for its paper-inspired aesthetic, writing, and characters, but changes to gameplay, such as in combat, received mixed reception. Recent entries since the release of Sticker Star have been criticized for the removal of original fictional races, the abundance of identical Toads, and the restrictions limiting unique character designs.

The Mario & Luigi series was developed by AlphaDream and published by Nintendo, the first game being Mario & Luigi: Superstar Saga for the Game Boy Advance in 2003. The Nintendo 3DS remake of Bowser's Inside Story was AlphaDream's final game before declaring bankruptcy in 2019. Three months after the declaration, however, Nintendo filed a trademark for the series in Argentina. The series had generally received critical acclaim, being praised for their writing, gameplay, and graphics, with some criticism for lack of innovation.

The Mario + Rabbids series is co-developed by Ubisoft Milan and Ubisoft Paris and published worldwide by Ubisoft and published in Asia by Nintendo and is a crossover series with the Raving Rabbids franchise, the first being Mario + Rabbids Kingdom Battle for the Nintendo Switch in 2017.

Standalone games

Paper Mario series

Mario & Luigi series

Mario + Rabbids series

Remakes

References 

 
Role-playing games
Nintendo franchises
Paper Mario
Lists of video games by franchise